Daniele is an Hebrew male given name, the cognate of the English name Daniel.

Danièle is a French female given name, an alternative spelling of Danielle.

Men with the given name Daniele 
 Daniele Bracciali (born 1978), Italian tennis player
 Daniele Callegarin (born 1982), Italian former cyclist
 Daniele Colli (born 1982), Italian road racing cyclist
 Daniele De Rossi (born 1983), Italian footballer
 Daniele Giorgini (born 1984), Italian tennis player
 Daniele Greco (born 1989), Italian triple jumper
 Daniele Greco (footballer) (born 1988), Italian footballer
 Daniele Luchetti (born 1960), Italian film director, screenwriter and actor
 Daniele Manin (1804–1857), Italian patriot and politician
 Daniele Martinelli (born 1982), Italian footballer
 Daniele Russo (born 1985), Swiss footballer
 Daniele Silvestri (born 1968), Italian singer and songwriter
 Daniele Sommariva (born 1997), Italian footballer
 Daniele Vargas, stage name of Italian film actor Daniele Pitani (1922–1992)
 Daniele da Volterra (c. 1509–1566), Italian painter and sculptor

Women with the given name Danièle 
 Danièle Djamila Amrane-Minne (born 1939), convicted of assisting the FLN during the Algerian War, later professor of history and feminist studies
 Danièle Ciarlet (born 1943), birth name of Zouzou (model), French model, actress and singer
 Danièle Debernard (born 1954), French former alpine skier
 Danièle Delorme (1927–2015), stage name of French actress and film producer Gabrielle Danièle Marguerite Andrée Girard
 Danièle Dorice (1935–2018), Canadian singer and teacher
 Danièle Guinot, French biologist
 Danièle Hervieu-Léger (born 1947), French sociologist
 Danièle Heymann (1933-2019), French journalist and film critic
 Danièle Hoffman-Rispal (born 1951), French politician
 Danièle Huillet (1936–2006), French filmmaker
 Danièle Kaber (born 1960), retired long-distance runner from Luxembourg
 Danièle Kergoat (b. 1942), French academic and feminist sociologist
 Danièle Lebrun (born 1937), French actress
 Danièle Nouy (born 1950), Chair of the Supervisory Board at the European Central Bank
 Danièle Nyst (1942–1998), Belgian video artist
 Danièle Parola (1905–1998), French film actress
 Danièle Sallenave (born 1940), French novelist and journalist
 Danièle Sauvageau (born 1962), Canadian ice hockey executive and former head coach of the Canadian women's team
 Danièle Thompson (born 1942), film director and screenwriter from Monaco
 Danièle Watts, American actress

See also 
 List of people named Daniel
 Danielle

Danièle
Italian masculine given names
Sammarinese given names